Infanta Maria of Portugal (Coimbra, 21 November 1264 – Coimbra, 6 June 1304) was a Portuguese infanta (princess) daughter of King Afonso III of Portugal and his second wife Beatrice of Castile.

Maria was born on 21 November 1264 in Coimbra and was for the majority of her life a nun in the Convent of the Lady Canons of Saint John (Convento das Donas Cónegas de São João), near the Monastery of Santa Cruz of Coimbra. She died in the same city on 6 June 1304.

Ancestry

1264 births
1304 deaths
Portuguese infantas
13th-century Portuguese nuns
14th-century Portuguese nuns
House of Burgundy-Portugal
People from Coimbra
Daughters of kings